Koranad is a suburb of the town of Mayiladuthurai in the Mayiladuthurai District of Tamil Nadu, India. Koranad is a popular weaving centre and is known for "Korainadu cloths" or "Koorai pattu" manufactured using a mixture of cotton and silk thread.  The Punukeswarar Temple is located in Kornad.

Notes 

Cities and towns in Mayiladuthurai district